D'Urville Wall is a great glacier-cut wall of granite which rises to  and forms the north wall of David Glacier near its terminus, in the Prince Albert Mountains of Victoria Land. It was discovered by the British Antarctic Expedition, 1907–09, under Ernest Shackleton, and he named this feature for Admiral Jules Dumont d'Urville.

References
 

Rock formations of Victoria Land
Scott Coast